HMS Eclipse was an  protected cruiser built for the Royal Navy in the mid-1890s.

Design
Eclipse-class second-class protected cruisers were preceded by the shorter Astraea-class cruisers. Eclipse had a displacement of  when at normal load. It was powered by two inverted triple-expansion steam engines which used steam from eight cylindrical boilers.

It carried five 40-calibre  quick-firing (QF) guns in single mounts protected by gun shields. One gun was mounted on the forecastle, two on the quarterdeck and one pair was abreast the bridge. The secondary armament consisted of six 40-calibre  guns; three on each broadside. It was fitted with three 18-inch torpedo tubes, one submerged tube on each broadside and one above water in the stern. Its ammunition supply consisted of 200 six-inch rounds per gun, 250 shells for each 4.7-inch gun, 300 rounds per gun for the s and 500 for each three-pounder. Eclipse had ten torpedoes, presumably four for each broadside tube and two for the stern tube.

Service
HMS Eclipse was launched in 1894 and completed in 1897. In 1899 she served in the Indian Ocean under the command of Captain P. W. Bush, as flagship of the East Indies Squadron.

She was commissioned at Chatham dockyard in late May 1901, with a crew of 450 officers and men under the command of Captain Robert Henry Simpson Stokes, to relieve HMS Hermione on the China Station.

On the outbreak of the First World War she formed part of the 12th Cruiser Squadron, which patrolled at the Western end of the English Channel, with particular duties to stop suspicious vessels and prevent disguised minelayers from interfering with cross-Channel traffic.

Footnotes

References

 

Eclipse-class cruisers
Ships built in Portsmouth
1894 ships